Shot Caller is a 2017 American crime thriller film written and directed by Ric Roman Waugh. The film chronicles the transformation of a well-to-do family man, played by Nikolaj Coster-Waldau, into a hardened prison gangster, which he undergoes to survive California's penal system after he is incarcerated for his role in a deadly DUI car accident. The film also stars Omari Hardwick, Lake Bell, Jon Bernthal, Emory Cohen, Jeffrey Donovan, Evan Jones, Benjamin Bratt, and Holt McCallany.

It premiered at the Los Angeles Film Festival on June 16, 2017. The film was released on July 20, 2017, through DirecTV Cinema and theatrically on August 18, 2017, by Saban Films.

Plot
Jacob Harlon is a successful stockbroker living with his wife, Katherine, and son Joshua, in California. One night, he drives his wife and friends home under the influence and causes a collision which kills one of his friends. After taking a plea deal, Jacob is sentenced to 16 months at the California Institution for Men in Chino.

On his first night inside, Harlon overhears the gang rape of a fellow inmate and quickly decides his only chance at survival is to go on the offensive. The next day, he stands his ground and attacks an African-American inmate when provoked, drawing the attention of Bottles, the "shot caller" for the white supremacist gang PENI; in return for protection and entry into the gang, Jacob is forced to smuggle heroin and kill a snitch. Over time, Harlon rises in rank, obtains the alias "Money", and grows even more hardened by prison life. During a riot, Harlon stabs another inmate to save the life of the head of the Sureños, earning him respect from other gang leaders, but is caught on camera and sentenced to nine years (to run concurrently to his original sentence) as a result. Harlon then ceases all contact with his family, demanding that they move on and forget him. Harlon is eventually transferred to Corcoran State Prison where he is introduced to "The Beast", the leader of the Aryan Brotherhood there. Impressed with Harlon's dedication, The Beast promotes him to his second-in-command.

As he is set to be released, Harlon is ordered by The Beast to orchestrate a weapons deal with the Sureños. Though Harlon is initially hesitant as he will be on parole, he eventually relents after The Beast threatens his family. Upon release, he is greeted by "Shotgun" and other gang members, including Howie, a young Afghanistan war veteran with no criminal record. Harlon survives an attack at a party and orders Howie to answer to no one but him.

Harlon's parole officer Ed Kutcher was recently involved in a shootout with a reoffending pedophile parolee, where he himself was shot before killing the man, is dealing with the physical and emotional trauma from the event. Kutcher is tipped off about the weapons deal and places Harlon under surveillance, who then discovers that Shotgun is Kutcher's informant. After Harlon transfers his finances to his wife, she brings Joshua to meet him against his wishes, and has a brief emotional breakdown after realizing his son has grown up without him. On the day of the deal, Harlon evades his surveillance and kills Shotgun at his home.  Kutcher finds Shotgun dead and discovers his cellphone has a message about the pending gun deal. After meeting the Sureños, Harlon texts their coordinates to Shotgun's cellphone. Realizing that Shotgun hid more of the weapons to sell himself, Harlon warns Howie to leave the criminal life and forces him out of their vehicle. As the deal closes, the police, ATF, and SWAT—alerted by Harlon's text—surround the gangs; only Howie manages to escape and watches from a distance, realizing Harlon saved his life.

Fully validated, Harlon is sentenced to life imprisonment with no possibility of parole. He turns down Kutcher's offer to testify against The Beast in exchange for a full pardon. Harlon is returned to Corcoran where The Beast, having learned Harlon alerted authorities to the location of the raid, tells him his family will be killed. Harlon had anticipated The Beast's retaliation and concealed a handcuff key and a razor blade in a butt safe. He frees himself and confronts The Beast in his cell. After a brief fight, Harlon cuts The Beast's jugular vein and kills him. He orders a prison guard to report that he acted in self-defense. He then assumes The Beast's place as gang leader.

With his family's safety secured, Harlon accepts his life sentence, and notifies Kutcher about the remaining weapons. He receives a letter from Joshua, explaining that he and Katherine are moving on, living a successful and happy life, and that he has forgiven his father. Harlon is moved emotionally as he looks at pictures of his former life with his family, and accepts that sacrificing his own freedom to kill The Beast was the only way he could protect his family from his enemies. Harlon then goes outside to exercise in the yard.

Cast

Production
On April 9, 2015, Bold Films came on board to fully finance and produce the crime thriller film Shot Caller, to be directed by Ric Roman Waugh, based on his own script. Participant Media developed the project, while Participant's Jonathan King produced, along with Michel Litvak and Matthew Rhodes of Bold Films, and Waugh. In April 2015, Relativity Media acquired the U.S. rights to the film for $3 million with a wide release commitment, and Sierra/Affinity was on board to handle international sales. Since Relativity Media filed for bankruptcy in July 2015, the film's release was postponed until Saban Films acquired the U.S. distribution rights in April 2017.

Principal photography began on May 26, 2015, in Albuquerque and Santa Fe, New Mexico.

Reception
On Rotten Tomatoes, the film has an approval rating of 69% based on 49 reviews, with an average score of 5.9/10, and the consensus reads "Shot Caller's weakness for action movie clichés is capably offset by strong work from Nikolaj Coster-Waldau in the central role". On Metacritic, the film has a score of 59 out of 100 based on reviews from 10 critics, indicating "mixed or average reviews".

Peter Debruge of Variety wrote: "It's a genre movie, to be sure, but there's an impressive sense of authenticity—in the language, the locations and the overall texture—that goes a long way to sell the scenario."

References

External links
 

2017 films
2017 crime thriller films
2010s American films
2010s English-language films
2010s prison films
American crime thriller films
American gangster films
American prison films
Bold Films films
Films about arms trafficking
Films about organized crime in the United States
Films directed by Ric Roman Waugh
Films scored by Antônio Pinto
Films set in California
Films shot in New Mexico
Hood films
Participant (company) films
Saban Films films
Sureños